Greg Kolenda is a former American football offensive tackle who played college football at the University of Arkansas. He was a consensus All-American in 1979.

References

External links
Fanbase profile

Living people
Year of birth missing (living people)
Place of birth missing (living people)
Players of American football from Louisiana
American football offensive tackles
Arkansas Razorbacks football players
All-American college football players